Juan Pedro Gutiérrez Lanas, commonly known as either Juampi Gutiérrez or J. P. Gutiérrez, (born October 10, 1983) is a former Argentine-Spanish professional basketball player. He played at the power forward and center positions.

Professional career
Gutiérrez began his professional career in the Liga Nacional de Básquet with Obras Sanitarias during the 2001–02 season. In 2004, he joined the Spanish ACB League club Granada. He returned to Obras Sanitarias in 2010, where he played for two seasons, when the club won two titles. He signed with the Spanish League club CB Canarias for the 2013–14 season.

National team career
Gutiérrez defended Argentina, making his debut in 2004 at the FIBA South American Championship, bringing home a gold medal at the 2011 FIBA Americas Championship, silver medals at the 2005 FIBA Americas Championship and the 2007 FIBA Americas Championship, and bronze medals at the 2008 Summer Olympic Games and the 2009 FIBA Americas Championship.

Awards and accomplishments

Pro career
FIBA South American League MVP: (2011)
2× Argentine League MVP: (2011, 2012)

Argentina national team
2004 FIBA South American Championship: 
2005 FIBA Americas Championship: 
2006 FIBA South American Championship: 
2007 FIBA Americas Championship: 
2008 FIBA South American Championship: 
2008 FIBA Diamond Ball Tournament: 
2008 Summer Olympic Games: 
2009 FIBA Americas Championship: 
2010 FIBA South American Championship: 
2011 FIBA Americas Championship: 
2012 FIBA South American Championship:

References

External links
FIBA Profile
Latinbasket.com Profile
Spanish League Profile 

1983 births
Living people
Argentine expatriate basketball people in Spain
Argentine men's basketball players
Argentine people of Spanish descent
Basketball players at the 2008 Summer Olympics
Basketball players at the 2012 Summer Olympics
CB Canarias players
CB Granada players
Centers (basketball)
Liga ACB players
Medalists at the 2008 Summer Olympics
Obras Sanitarias basketball players
Olympic basketball players of Argentina
Olympic bronze medalists for Argentina
Olympic medalists in basketball
Power forwards (basketball)
Spanish men's basketball players
Sportspeople from Buenos Aires Province
2010 FIBA World Championship players